Air Chief Marshal Sohail Aman  (born 10 June 1959) is a retired four star air officer who served as the Chief of Air Staff of the Pakistan Air Force. He took charge from Air Chief Marshal Tahir Rafique Butt on 19 March 2015. He retired on 18 March 2018, on completion of the three-year term as Air Chief.

Biography

Sohail Aman was born in 1959, and graduated from the PAF Public School in Sargodha in 1977. He is from a Sheikh Family. In 1978, Aman joined the Pakistan Air Force, which directed to join the PAF Academy in Risalpur, and graduated in 1980 where he gained commissioned as a P/Off. in GD(P) class.

Sohail Aman completed his early education from Govt. Central Model High School, Lower Mall, Lahore. He attended the elite Combat Commander's School in Mushaf Air Force Base. Aman attended the Air War College in Karachi where he attained the master's degree in Strategic studies, and later went to the United Kingdom where he attended the King's College London graduating with MA in defence studies in 1980.

Besides flying F-16s in the Pakistan Air Force, ACM Sohail has also flown F-15s in Saudi Arabia and Tornado's in the United Kingdom.

Awards and decorations

Foreign decorations

Effective dates of promotions

See also
 Shahid Lateef
 Pakistan Air Force

References

|-

1959 births
Living people
University of Karachi alumni
Alumni of King's College London
Pakistan Air Force Academy alumni
Chiefs of Air Staff, Pakistan
Pakistan Air Force air marshals
Recipients of Hilal-i-Imtiaz
Recipients of Sitara-i-Imtiaz
Pakistani flying aces
Pakistani test pilots
Central Model School, Lahore alumni